The Birmingham Solar Oscillations Network (BiSON) consists of a network of six remote solar observatories monitoring low-degree solar oscillation modes. It is operated by the High Resolution Optical Spectroscopy group of the School of Physics and Astronomy at the University of Birmingham, UK, in collaboration with Sheffield Hallam University, UK. They are funded by the Science and Technology Facilities Council (STFC).

The BiSON has been collecting data continuously on solar oscillations since 1976, making it the longest running helioseismology network with data covering three solar cycles.

Team

Academic staff
 Professor Yvonne Elsworth (Head of project)
 Professor Bill Chaplin

Research staff
 Anne-Marie Broomhall — Helioseismology
 Andrea Miglio
 Steven Hale

Technical staff
 Mr Ian Barnes — Electronics
 Mr Barry Jackson — Mechanics

Remote observatories

BiSON operates automated resonant scattering spectrometers in astronomical domes or mirror fed systems. The network was established in 1976 with two permanent stations; the addition of several more sites culminated with the addition of a sixth in 1992. The current sites are:
 Mount Wilson Observatory, California, USA
 Las Campanas Observatory, Region IV, Chile
 Observatorio del Teide, Tenerife, Canary Islands, Spain
 South African Astronomical Observatory, Sutherland, South Africa
 OTC Earth Station Carnarvon, Carnarvon, WA, Australia
 Paul Wild Observatory, Narrabri, NSW, Australia

See also
 List of astronomical observatories
 List of astronomical societies

References

External links
 BiSON homepage
 BiSON Data 
 Realtime BiSON Telemetry and Cameras

Telescopes
Science and technology in the United States
Science and technology in Chile
Scientific organisations based in Chile
Science and technology in Spain
Science and technology in South Africa
Science and technology in Australia
Astronomical observatories in Western Australia
Science and Technology Facilities Council